Jorge Cardona Marquez (born 2 November 1987 in Zaragoza) is a class 10 table tennis player from Spain.

Personal 
In 2013, he was awarded the bronze Real Orden al Mérito Deportivo, at a ceremony at the Teatro de Madrid Cofidis, and attended by Princess Elena, Minister of Education, Culture and Sport, José Ignacio Wert, the president of the Higher Sports Council (CSD), Miguel Cardinal, and the Director General of Sports of CSD, Ana Muñoz.

Table tennis 
He is a class 10 table tennis player.  He won a gold medal at the 2007 European Championships in 2007.  At the Italian hosted 2009 European Championships, he won a gold medal. In 2010 at the South Korean hosted World Championships, he finished second. He competed in the 2013 European Championships, earning a bronze in the individual event and a silver in the silver in the team event. In October 2013, he was ranked eighth in the world in his classification.

Paralympics 
He played table tennis at the 2008 Summer Paralympics and the 2012 Summer Paralympics. In 2008, he finished second in team table tennis.  In 2012, he finished third in team class 9–10.

References

External links 
 
 

1987 births
Spanish male table tennis players
Table tennis players at the 2008 Summer Paralympics
Table tennis players at the 2012 Summer Paralympics
Paralympic table tennis players of Spain
Medalists at the 2008 Summer Paralympics
Medalists at the 2012 Summer Paralympics
Paralympic medalists in table tennis
Paralympic silver medalists for Spain
Paralympic bronze medalists for Spain
Sportspeople from Zaragoza
Living people
Medalists at the 2016 Summer Paralympics